The phrase "suicide, it's a suicide" was first used by rapper KRS-One in the song "Moshitup" (Just-Ice feat. KRS-One) in 1987. It has since entered into hip hop music as a meme, and has been used by artists such as Ice-T, Gravediggaz, Redman, Fabolous, Ras Kass, Jay-Z, Jedi Mind Tricks, Snoop Dogg, Goldie Lookin' Chain, Krayzie Bone, Wyclef Jean, Pusha T and Lil Wayne. It serves as a good example of the intertextual nature of the genre, where quoting older works serves as a form of homage to other artists.

Origin
The phrase was first used in 1987 by Boogie Down Productions's KRS-One, an early socially and politically conscious East Coast rapper. He co-produced Just-Ice's album Kool & Deadly, and contributed vocals on the track "Moshitup". KRS-One is vegetarian, and used the phrase to warn against the dangers of eating pork:

The phrase has gained popularity because it just "sounds cool and dangerous". Use of the line serves as an insider's reference to KRS-One, as the phrase is further repeated.

Legacy
The line made its way to West Coast rap in 1991, when Ice-T used it in the song "Ricochet" from the film by the same name. Two years later it was repeated on fellow West Coast rapper Snoop Dogg's track "Serial Killa"from the album Doggystyleby RBX. It has since been used by Scarface and Redman in different songs titled "Suicide", by the group Gravediggaz on the single "1-800 Suicide", and by Nelly on Fat Joe's hit single "Get It Poppin'". Welsh comedy rappers Goldie Lookin Chain, who also quote KRS-One's "Sound of da Police" in "Guns Don't Kill People, Rappers Do," appropriated the phrase for their song "Self Suicide." In 2008, Fabolous used it on "Suicide" from his Gangsta Grillz: There Is No Competition mixtape. The phrase entered into mainstream pop music in 2008 when it was used by Jay-Z on the remix of Coldplay's single "Lost!" (titled "Lost+").
Nas used a variation of the phrase in the song "Nah Mean" on the album Distant Relatives, using the word "genocide" instead, presumably referring to Darfur. LL Cool J's song "Homicide" from his 2000 album G.O.A.T. uses a variation of the phrase. In his track "Suicide" released on his 2013 album My Name is My Name, Pusha T also echoes the lyric. Lil Wayne used the lyric on his Dedication 6: Reloaded mixtape, in the song "Bloody Mary", which features rapper Juelz Santana.

References

English phrases
Hip hop phrases
1987 neologisms